Deh Zir or Deh-e Zir may refer to:
 Deh Zir, Jahrom, Fars Province
 Deh Zir, Neyriz, Fars Province
 Deh-e Zir, Qatruyeh, Neyriz County, Fars Province
 Deh-e Zir, Isfahan
 Deh Zir, Kerman
 Deh Zir, Khuzestan
 Deh-e Zir, Sistan and Baluchestan